Home Counties is the ninth studio album by English alternative dance band Saint Etienne, released on 2 June 2017 by Heavenly Recordings. The album features collaborations with Gerard Johnson, Augustus (also known as Gus Lobban of Kero Kero Bonito) and Nick Moon (of Kyte). The album features production from Shawn Lee, Carwyn Ellis and Richard X.

Critical reception

Home Counties received generally positive reviews from music critics. At Metacritic, which assigns a normalised rating out of 100 to reviews from mainstream publications, the album received an average score of 79, based on 16 reviews.

Commercial performance
Home Counties debuted at number 31 on the UK Albums Chart, selling 3,215 copies in its first week.

Track listing
All tracks produced by Saint Etienne and Shawn Lee, except where noted.

Notes
  signifies an additional producer

Personnel
Credits adapted from the liner notes of Home Counties.

Saint Etienne
 Sarah Cracknell – vocals
 Bob Stanley – keyboards
 Pete Wiggs – keyboards

Additional musicians

 Shawn Lee – drums, percussion, programming, Maestro Rhythm King, bass, guitars, banjo, vibraphone, Mellotron, Yamaha ED10, Siel synth, Casio CZ101, Yamaha CS-5, Roland MC-202, Crumar Multiman, microKORG, Omnichord, glockenspiel, marimba, tambourine handclaps, backing vocals
 Gerard Johnson – voice ; piano ; Fender Rhodes, Hammond organ, Teisco 100P, Yamaha YS100 
 Carwyn Ellis – bass, guitars, Mellotron, harpsichord, Hammond organ 
 Augustus – programming ; Novation Bass Station, Kawai PHm, Yamaha PSR-76 ; Roland MT-32, Korg 101 
 Ben Greenslade-Stanton – trombone, trumpet 
 Mark Waterfield – guitar, backing vocals 
 Lawrence Oakley – programming, Nord Lead 3, backing vocals 
 Tim Larcombe – bass 
 James Arben – flute 
 Ken Bruce – voice 
 Wolf – voice

Technical

 Shawn Lee – production ; mixing 
 Saint Etienne – production 
 Pierre Duplan – engineering ; mixing 
 Carwyn Ellis – production 
 Augustus – production 
 Richard X – additional production, mixing 
 Pete Wiggs – production 
 Nick Moon – production 
 Guy Davie – mastering at Electric Mastering (London)

Artwork
 Scott King – art, design
 Rhys Atkinson – art assistance, design assistance
 Dee Noble – photography

Charts

References

2017 albums
Albums produced by Richard X
Heavenly Recordings albums
Saint Etienne (band) albums